HD 106515 is a binary star (and currently visual triple system) in the constellation of Virgo.

The A and B stars are both K-type main-sequence stars, both somewhat smaller and cooler than the Sun. The two are gravitationally bound and separated at 310 AU. The binary semimajor axis is 390 AU.

The third star in the visual triple, BD−06°3533, is a physically unrelated background star.

Properties
HD 106515 AB is a wide binary system which was first observed by Jérôme de Lalande in 1795.

The discovery of HD 106515 Ab was announced in a preprint submitted on September 12, 2011. The discovery was made using radial velocity measurements obtained at the CORALIE spectrograph located at La Silla Observatory. Confirmation of the discovery was made by a separate team using the Galileo National Telescope at the Roque de los Muchachos Observatory on the island of La Palma in the Canary Islands, Spain. Initially announced as an exoplanet, astrometric observations in 2021 have found that the true mass is significantly higher than its minimum mass predicted from radial velocity, so it is likely a brown dwarf. A 2022 study found a true mass closer to the minimum mass, but the parameters are less well constrained.

References

Planetary systems with one confirmed planet
Binary stars
Virgo (constellation)
Durchmusterung objects
106515
059743
K-type main-sequence stars